Mark Billcliff (born 21 April 1977) is a New Zealand former cricketer. He played two first-class matches for Otago in 1998/99. Billcliff was married to Sarah Dowie, a Member of Parliament, but they separated in 2018. His brother is cricketer Ian Billcliff, who played internationally for Canada. Billicliff was born at Dunedin and educated at Otago Boys High School.

References

External links
 

1977 births
Living people
New Zealand cricketers
Otago cricketers
Cricketers from Dunedin